Pluteus nigroviridis is a mushroom in the family Pluteaceae. Found in Europe, it was first described scientifically by Hungarian mycologist Margit Babos in 1983.

Chemistry
Fruit bodies of the fungus contain the psychoactive compounds psilocin and psilocybin.

See also
List of Pluteus species
List of Psilocybin mushrooms

References

External links

Fungi described in 1983
Fungi of Europe
nigroviridis
Psychoactive fungi
Psychedelic tryptamine carriers